Kathryn M. Zurek is an American physicist and professor of theoretical physics at the California Institute of Technology. Her research interests primarily lie at the intersection of particle physics with cosmology and particle astrophysics. She is known for her theories on dark matter's "hidden valleys", also known as hidden sectors.

Biography
Zurek was born and raised in Minnesota. She studied for a bachelor's degree in physics at Bethel University, where she graduated summa cum laude in 2001 and was awarded the 2001 Seaborg Nobel Travel Award to participate in Nobel Foundation events and present to Nobel laureates. She then received a Ph.D. in physics from the University of Washington in 2006. She was a postdoctoral fellow at the University of Wisconsin–Madison and served as the David Schramm Fellow in Fermilab's theoretical astrophysics group.

From 2009 to 2014, Zurek was an assistant and then associate professor at the University of Michigan. In 2014, she joined the Joint Particle Theory Group at the Berkeley Center for Theoretical Physics. She became a professor of theoretical physics at Caltech in 2019.

Awards and honors 
 Fellow of the American Physical Society (2016)
 Simons Investigator award (2020)

Selected publications

In the press 
“Berkeley Leans into Search for Light Dark Matter,” 10 June 2019, Symmetry Magazine.

“In Search for Unseen Matter, Physicists Turn to Dark Sector,” 24 March 2017, Science.

"New Techniques Could Target More Exotic Dark Matter," 13 October 2016, Scientific American.

"Physics - Synopsis: Spotting Dark Matter with Supermaterials,"14 September 2016, APS Physics.

"Hunting for Dark Matter's Hidden Valley," 24 May 2016 in Berkeley Lab News Center.

"Physicists Widen the Search for Dark Matter Particles," June 2014, APS News.

"Dark Matter Hunt Appears to be Zeroing In on a Leading Contender," 22 July 2013 in Wired Science.

"Tentative dark matter hints with shadow dark sector," 16 April 2013 in New Scientist.

"Peering Back 13 Billion Years, Through a Gravitational Lens," 29 April 2011 in Science.

"The dark side of antimatter," by Rachel Courtland, 25 November 2010 in New Scientist.

"Super-sensitive tool key to dark matter claim" 9 July 2008 in Nature.

References

External links
 Official website

California Institute of Technology faculty
Lawrence Berkeley National Laboratory people
People associated with Fermilab
Fellows of the American Physical Society
Simons Investigator
21st-century American physicists
University of Washington alumni
Living people
Year of birth missing (living people)
Bethel University (Minnesota) alumni
American women physicists
University of Michigan faculty
American women academics
21st-century American women scientists